Karol Stanisław Radziwiłł  may refer to:
 Karol Stanisław Radziwiłł (1669–1719), Polish nobleman, Grand Chancellor of Lithuania
 Karol Stanisław Radziwiłł (1734–1790), commonly known as "Panie Kochanku", Polish prince, Voivode of Vilnius and Marshal of the Bar Confederation